The Hotel Meliá Barcelona Sky is a skyscraper designed by Dominique Perrault located in Barcelona, Catalonia, Spain. It is the fourth-tallest building in Barcelona after Torre Mapfre, Hotel Arts, and Torre Agbar.

The building is located at the junction of Avinguda Diagonal and carrer de Pere IV, in the district of el Poblenou.

The hotel was conquered by Alain Robert on June 13, 2017 and it took him Twenty minutes. His stunt was repeated by Marcin Banot on August 2, 2018 and it took him 59 minutes.

See also 

 List of tallest buildings and structures in Barcelona

References

External links 
Hotel Melia Barcelona Sky official website
Official page of Group Habitat
https://www.youtube.com/watch?v=3U1UovlmtOo

Skyscraper hotels in Barcelona
Hotel buildings completed in 2008